Elizabeth Martha Beckley (c.1846-6 August 1927) was a pioneering British astronomical photographer.

She was the daughter of Robert Beckley, a mechanical engineer based at Kew Observatory, who developed the Beckley rain gauge and the Robinson-Beckley anemometer with Thomas Romney Robinson.

Beckley worked at Kew Observatory from 1854 while still a young girl, where she was one of the first women to work at an astronomical observatory. She photographed the sun in the 1860s and 1870s using a photoheliograph.

Beckley married fellow Kew Observatory employee George Mathews Whipple (15 September 1842-8 February 1893) in 1870. They had five sons. The eldest was Robert Whipple, who was a scientific instrument collector, and founded the Whipple Museum of the History of Science in Cambridge. While another was Francis Whipple, who was superintendent at Kew Observatory from 1925 to 1939.

References

1846 births
1927 deaths
19th-century British astronomers
Women astronomers